Etrian Odyssey V: Beyond the Myth is a dungeon crawler role-playing video game developed and published by Atlus for the Nintendo 3DS. The game was released in Japan in August 2016, in North America in October 2017, and in the PAL region the following month.

Gameplay

Synopsis

Setting and characters

Plot

Development

Shigeo Komori returned as director of the game, after Daisuke Kaneda directed Etrian Odyssey IV. Komori had previously directed both Etrian Odyssey II and Etrian Odyssey III.

Release

Reception

Etrian Odyssey V was well received by critics, and was the eighth highest rated Nintendo 3DS game of 2017 on the review aggregator Metacritic.

The game was nominated for "Handheld Game of the Year" at the 21st Annual D.I.C.E. Awards.

Notes

References

External links 

2016 video games
Atlus games
First-person party-based dungeon crawler video games
5
Fantasy video games
Nintendo 3DS eShop games
Nintendo 3DS games
Nintendo 3DS-only games
Nintendo Network games
Role-playing video games
Video game sequels
Video games scored by Yuzo Koshiro
Video games developed in Japan
Video games featuring protagonists of selectable gender
Deep Silver games
Single-player video games